Arunachala College of Engineering for Women at Kanyakumari ranks 2nd among all engineering college in Tamil Nadu and 1st among all women's engineering college in Tamil Nadu based on Anna University Results. Arunachala College offer various MBA, UG, PG and Research programs in Engineering and Technology. Arunachala College of Engineering for Women is located at Manavilai, Vellichanthai, Nagercoil, Kanyakumari district.

Achievements 
 Awarded as ″Best Women's Engineering College in India″ by AICTE Chairman during ISTE Awards, New Delhi. 
 2nd Place among all Engineering College in Tamil Nadu 
1st among all Women's Engineering College in Tamil Nadu 
  21 University Ranks in 2013 Batch
  23 University Ranks in 2014 Batch
  32 University Ranks in 2015 Batch
  34 University Ranks in 2016 Batch University Gold Medal in M.E (CEM)
  15 University Ranks in 2017 Batch
  20 University Ranks in 2018 Batch
 418 Students of 2016 Batch are placed in Reputed Companies
 373 Students of 2017 Batch are placed in Reputed Companies

Courses offered 
 B.E. in Electronics and Communication Engineering
 B.E. in Computer Science and Engineering
 B.Tech in Artificial Intelligence and Data Science
 B.E. in Civil Engineering
 B.E. in Electrical and Electronics Engineering
 M.E Communication Systems
 M.E Applied Electronics
 M.E Computer Science and Engineering
 M.E Construction Engineering & Management
 M.E Power Electronics & Drives
 Ph.D in Electrical and Electronics Engineering
 M.B.A

References

Women's engineering colleges in India
Private engineering colleges in Tamil Nadu
Colleges affiliated to Anna University
Universities and colleges in Kanyakumari district